Three Sides Live is the third live album by the English rock band Genesis, released as a double album on 4 June 1982 on Charisma Records in the United Kingdom. It was released by Atlantic Records in the United States. After touring in support of their studio album Abacab ended in December 1981 the band entered an eight-month break in activity, during which they selected recordings from their previous tours for a live album. Three Sides Live includes recordings between 1976 and 1981; the UK edition contains additional live tracks on the fourth side of the double LP, while the original international edition featured tracks from their 1982 EP 3×3 and B-sides from Duke. Subsequent international reissues have adopted the UK track sequence.

Three Sides Live received a mostly positive critical reception and was a commercial success, peaking at No. 2 on the UK Albums Chart and No. 10 on the US Billboard 200, where it sold 500,000 copies. Its release coincided with the band's Three Sides Live concert film. It was remastered in 1994 and 2009, the latter for their Genesis Live 1973–2007 box set.

Background 
In December 1981, Genesis wrapped their four-month tour of Europe and North America to support the release of their eleventh studio album, Abacab (1981). The band then entered an eight-month break in activity, during which they each pursued solo projects and selected recordings from their previous tours for inclusion on a new live album. All editions of Three Sides Live contain recordings from their 1980 and 1981 tours across the first three sides. The fourth side of the UK edition contains additional live tracks from 1976, 1978, and 1980, while the international edition contains tracks from the group's second EP 3×3 (1982) – "Paperlate", "You Might Recall", and "Me and Virgil" and two B-sides recorded during the sessions for Duke (1980) – "Open Door" and "Evidence of Autumn".

Release 
Three Sides Live reached No. 2 in the UK and No. 10 in the US. It was certified silver and gold by the British Phonographic Industry (BPI) on 14 June 1982, the latter for 100,000 copies sold. In the United States, the album was certified gold by the Recording Industry Association of America (RIAA) on 4 October 1982 for 500,000 copies sold.

Reception 

Rolling Stone gave the album a rave review, particularly praising Genesis's advancement to more refined and concise material: "Unlike Seconds Out, where the concert versions of Genesis' songs were shrouded in virtuosic bluster, this album offers incisive, sharply focused performances uncluttered by theatrics or instrumental tedium." AllMusic's retrospective review asserted that the performances were impressive and exciting throughout, delivering nothing but "lean, crisp, and generally bracing accounts of the group's then-current sound."

In a review published in Record Mirror by Robin Smith, the album received a mixed response. The atmosphere he experienced in concert at one of their Wembley Arena gigs in 1981 was absent from the album, which he deemed "hardly a sparkling addition" to the Genesis catalogue. Smith attributed this to the song selection and it being recorded with "less than inspired audiences". He praised the performances of "Dodo/Lurker", "Behind the Lines", "Duchess", but picked the third and fourth side as stand out tracks. Smith concluded that he would be listening to Seconds Out, the band's second live album, "for years to come".

Reissues 
In 1994, Three Sides Live was remastered and reissued with the UK edition worldwide. Four of the five additional studio selections from that out of print release were issued in 2000 on the Genesis Archive 2: 1976–1992 box set (all but "Me And Virgil"), and all five songs have since been included on the bonus disc of the Genesis 1976–1982 box set.

Track listing 
Track listing is adapted from the album's 1982 liner notes.

Personnel 
Credits are adapted from the album's 1982 liner notes.

Genesis
 Phil Collins – drums, lead vocals
 Tony Banks – keyboards, backing vocals
 Mike Rutherford – guitar, bass guitar, backing vocals
 Steve Hackett – guitar on "it."/"Watcher of the Skies"

Additional musicians
 Daryl Stuermer – guitar, bass
 Chester Thompson – drums, percussion
 Bill Bruford – drums on "it."/"Watcher of the Skies"

Production
 Genesis – production
 David Hentschel – engineering on "Follow You Follow Me", "One for the Vine", "The Fountain of Salmacis", and "it."/"Watcher of the Skies"
 Geoff Callingham – technical engineer on everything else
 Craig Schertz – sound engineer
 Bill Smith – cover
 Martyn Goddard – photography

Charts

Certifications

Notes and references 
Notes

Citations

Interviews

External links 

Genesis (band) live albums
1982 live albums
Atlantic Records live albums
Virgin Records live albums
Charisma Records live albums
Vertigo Records live albums